Latchkey or Latch-key may refer to:

A key used to open a latch
Latchkey kid, a child who returns from school to an empty home because their parents are away at work
The Latchkey, a 1910 film by the Thanhouser Company
Operation Latchkey,  a series of 38 nuclear test explosions conducted in 1966 and 1967 at the Nevada Test Site
The Latch-Key Child, the first album by the child rapper A+